Sadhvipramukha Kanakprabha was born in Calcutta, Bengal, British India, on 22 July 1941.
She attended Parmarthik Shikshan Sanstha, Ladnun (an institution where training is given before taking Jain initiation), at the age of 15. Her decision to lead the life of an ascetic was realised at the age of 19 after finishing her studies in Ladnun. She was initiated by the 9th head of Terapanth, Acharya Tulsi, on 8 July 1960.

In Jain Shwetamber Terapanth religious order, She had been declared the 8th Sadhvipramukha (head of nuns) on 14 Jan 1972 & Mahashramani on 17.01.1979 at Gangasahar.
She is a likewise qualified editor and author in Sanskrit, Prakrit and Hindi language. She breathed her last breath at Adhyatam Sadhna Kendra, Mehrauli, 8:45 am on 17th March, 2022.

Contribution
Many Jain Agamas were converted by her from Prakrit into Hindi language, more than 100 books written by Acharya Tulsi were edited by her.

A collection of poems called "sargam" was also released by her.
She has authored an epic on travelling "Yatra Granth" which is recognised as one of the great books of Hindi literature.
Few of her prominent books are listed as below

 Paanv-Paanv Chalnewala Suraj
 Jab Mahak Uthi Marudhar Maati
 Jaa ghar Aaye Sant Paahune
 Saason Kaa Iktaar (Poetry Collection)
 Sant Charan Ganga ki Dhara

She is the member of Core Committee of FUREC (Foundation of Unity of Religions and Enlighted Citizenship). FUREC is a non-profit organization set up to under the mentorship of immediate President of India Dr. A.P.J. Abdul Kalam & Spiritual Leader Acharya Mahapragya with the aim to sustain the human spirit on the basis of the acceptance of, and respect for, all religions, spirituality, economic well-being and the practice of Non-Violence.

See also
 Acharya Bhikshu
 Acharya Tulsi
 Acharya Mahapragya
 List of Important Jains in History
 Jain Vishva Bharti Institute, Ladnun

References
 Guardians of the Transcendent: an ethnography of a Jain ascetic community

External links

20th-century Indian Jains
20th-century Jain nuns
Indian Jain nuns
1941 births
Living people